The Ministry of Public Works, Transport and Communications is a ministry of the Government of Haiti. This ministry is responsible for Public Works, Transport and Communications and is part of the Prime Minister's Cabinet.

See also
 Electricity sector in Haiti

Government ministries of Haiti